Mira quién baila may refer to:

Mira quién baila (Spanish TV series)
Mira quién baila (American TV series), a 2010 American game show 
Mira quién baila (season 1)
Mira quién baila (season 2)
Mira quién baila (season 3)
Mira quién baila (season 4)
Mira quién baila (season 5)